Janet Hopner (born 15 January 1936) is an Australian fencer. She competed in the women's individual and team foil events at the 1964 Summer Olympics.

References

1936 births
Living people
Australian female foil fencers
Olympic fencers of Australia
Fencers at the 1964 Summer Olympics
Commonwealth Games medallists in fencing
Commonwealth Games bronze medallists for Australia
Fencers at the 1962 British Empire and Commonwealth Games
20th-century Australian women
Medallists at the 1962 British Empire and Commonwealth Games